The Forbidden City is a palace complex in Dongcheng District, Beijing, China.

Forbidden City may also refer to:

Places
 Forbidden City (Pyongyang), headquarters of the Worker's Party of Korea in North Korea
 Imperial City of Huế, or the Purple Forbidden City, in Vietnam
 Ming Palace, or the Forbidden City of Nanjing, China

Arts and entertainment
 The Forbidden City, a 1918 American film directed by Sidney Franklin
 Forbidden City (nightclub), a defunct Chinese cabaret in San Francisco, California, US
 Forbidden City (novel), a 1990 novel by William E. Bell
 "Forbidden City" (song), a 1996 song by Electronic
 "Forbidden City", a song by Tina Guo

See also
 Forbidden Gardens, a defunct outdoor museum of Chinese culture and history in Texas, US
 Forbidden Kingdom (disambiguation)
 Gugong (disambiguation)